Universitatea Reșița is a women handball club from Reşiţa, Romania, which plays in the Romanian Women's Handball League.

Kits

External links
  
 

Romanian handball clubs
Sport in Reșița